Zong was a mobile payment company that allowed users to make micropayments on the Internet if they have a postpaid mobile phone. The payments were charged to their mobile phone bills by the mobile operator. The company was acquired by eBay in 2011.

Zong payments were only accepted by online games and social networks, and the service can be used to purchase virtual goods. Zong was awarded the 2009 Frost & Sullivan Best Practices Award for New Product Innovation in the Mobile Payments category. In May 2015, Zong disappeared from the web without any public declaration. The website now simply redirects to PayPal.

See also 
 Mobile commerce service provider

References 

Companies based in Menlo Park, California
EBay
PayPal
Financial services companies established in 2008
American companies established in 2008
2008 establishments in California
2011 mergers and acquisitions
Mobile payments
Payment service providers